Sørodden is a headland and the most southern point of the island Storøya in the Svalbard archipelago, east of Nordaustlandet. The headland is also the southern part of the glacier Storøyjøkulen.

See also
Polarstarodden
Norvargodden

References

Headlands of Svalbard
Storøya